This is a list of state leaders in the 16th century (1501–1600) AD, of the Holy Roman Empire.

Main

Holy Roman Empire, Kingdom of Germany
Emperors Elect, Kings –
Maximilian I, Emperor Elect (1508–1519), King (1486–1519)
Charles V, Holy Roman Emperor (1530–1556), King (1519–1556)
Ferdinand I, Emperor Elect (1558–1564), King (1531–1564)
Maximilian II, Emperor Elect (1564–1576), King (1562–1576)
Rudolph II, Emperor Elect (1576–1612), King (1575–1612)
 –
Balthasar Merklin, Vice Chancellor (1527–1531)
Matthias von Held, Vice Chancellor (1531–1541)
Johann von Naves, Vice Chancellor (1541–1547)
Jakob von Jonas, Vice Chancellor (1547–1558)
Georg Sigmund Seld, Vice Chancellor (1559–1563)
Johann Ulrich Zasius, Vice Chancellor (1566–1570)
Siegmund Vieheuser, Vice Chancellor (1577–1587)
Jacob Kurz von Senftenau, Vice Chancellor (1587–1594)
Johann Wolfgang Freymann, Vice Chancellor (1594–1597)
Rudolf Coraduz von und zu Nußdorf, Vice Chancellor (1597–1606)

Austrian

Archduchy of Austria (complete list) –
Ladislaus I the Posthumous, Duke (1440–1453), Archduke (1453–1457)
Frederick V the Peaceful, Archduke (1457–1493)
Maximilian I the Last Knight, Archduke (1493–1519)
Charles I, Archduke (1519–1521)
Ferdinand I, Archduke (1521–1564)
Maximilian II, Archduke (1564–1576)
Rudolf V, Archduke (1576–1608)

Prince-Bishopric of Brixen (complete list) –
Melchior von Meckau, Prince-bishop (1488–1509)
, Prince-bishop (1509–1521)
, Prince-bishop (1521–1525)
George of Austria, Prince-bishop (1525–1539)
Bernardo Clesio, Prince-bishop (1539)
, Prince-bishop (1539–1542)
Cristoforo Madruzzo, Prince-bishop (1542–1578)
, Prince-bishop (1578–1591)
Andrew of Burgau, Prince-bishop (1591–1600)

Duchy of Carinthia (complete list) –
Maximilian I, Duke (1493–1519)
Charles I, Duke (1519–1521)
Ferdinand I, Duke (1521–1564)
Charles II, Duke (1564–1590)
Ferdinand II, Duke (1590–1637)

Prince-Bishopric of Chur (complete list) –
Heinrich V. von Hewen, Prince-bishop (1491–1505)
Paul Ziegler, Administrator (1505–1509), Administrator (1509–1541)
Lucius Iter, Prince-bishop (1541–1549)
Thomas Planta, Prince-bishop (1549–1565)
Beatus a Porta, Prince-bishop (1565–1581)
Peter de Raschèr, Prince-bishop (1581–1601)

Principality of Heitersheim (complete list) –
, Prince-prior (1554–1566)
, Prince-prior (1567–1573)
, Prince-prior (1573–1594)
Philip Riedesel zu Camberg, Prince-prior (1594–1598)
, Prince-prior (1598–1599)
, Prince-prior (1599–1601)

Duchy of Styria (complete list) –
Maximilian I, Duke (1493–1519)
Charles I, Duke (1519–1521)
Ferdinand I, Duke (1521–1564)
Charles II, Duke (1564–1590)
Ferdinand II, Duke (1590–1637)

Prince-Bishopric of Trent (complete list) –
Ulrich IV von Liechtenstein, Prince-bishop (1493–1505)
George II von Neideck, Prince-bishop (1505–1514)
Bernardo Clesio, Prince-bishop (1514–1539)
Cristoforo Madruzzo, Prince-bishop (1539–1567)
Ludovico Madruzzo, Prince-bishop (1567–1600)
Carlo Gaudenzio Madruzzo, Prince-bishop (1600–1629)

County of Tyrol (complete list) –
Maximilian I, Count (1490–1519)

Bavarian

Duchy of Bavaria: Bavaria-Landshut, Bavaria-Munich, Bavaria-Dachau (complete list) –
Sigismund, co-Duke of Bavaria-Munich (1460–1467), Duke of Bavaria-Dachau (1467–1501)
George I the Rich, Duke of Bavaria-Landshut (1479–1503)
Albert IV the Wise, Duke of Bavaria-Munich (1465–1505), of Bavaria (1505–1508)
William IV the Steadfast, Duke of Bavaria-Munich (1460–1508), of Bavaria-Landshut (1503–1508), of Bavaria (1508–1550)
Louis X, co-Duke (1516–1545)
Albert V the Magnanimous, Duke (1550–1579)
William V the Pious, Duke (1579–1597)
Maximilian I, Duke (1597–1623), Elector (1623–1651)

Berchtesgaden Prince-Provostry (complete list) –
Balthasar Hirschauer, Provost (1496–1508)
Gregor Rainer, Provost (1508–1522)
Wolfgang I Lenberger, Provost (1523–1541)
Wolfgang II Griestätter, Provost (1541–1559), Prince-provost (1559–1567)
Jakob II Putrich, Prince-provost (1567–1594)
Ferdinand of Bavaria, Prince-provost (1594–1650)

Prince-Bishopric of Freising (complete list) –
Philip of the Palatinate, Prince-bishop (1498–1541)
Henry II of the Palatinate, Prince-bishop (1541–1552)
Leo Lösch of Hilkertshausen, Prince-bishop (1552–1559)
Moritz of Sandizell, Prince-bishop (1559–1566)
Ernest of Bavaria, Prince-bishop (1566–1612)

Landgraviate of Leuchtenberg (de:complete list) –
John IV, Landgrave (1487–1531)
George III, Landgrave (1531–1555)
Louis Henry, Landgrave (1555–1567)
, Landgrave (1567–1613)

Prince-Abbey of Niedermünster (complete list) –
Agnes von Rothafft, Abbess (1475–1520)
Barbara II von Aham, Abbess (1520–1569)
Anna II von Kirmbreith, Abbess (1569–1598)
Katharina II Scheifflin, Abbess (1598–1605)

Prince-Abbey of Obermünster (complete list) –
Agnes II von Paulsdorff, Abbess (1500–?)
Katharina II von Redwitz, Abbess (1533–1536)
Wandula von Schaumberg, Abbess (1536–1542)
Barbara II von Sandizell, Abbess (?–1564)
Barbara III Ratzin, Abbess (1564–1579)
Magdalena von Gleissenthal, Abbess (1579–1594)
Margarethe II Mufflin, Abbess (1594–1608)

Imperial County of Ortenburg (complete list) –
Wolfgang, Count (1490–1519)
Ulrich II, Count (1519–1524)
Christoph, Count (1524–1551)
Joachim, Count (1551–1600)
Henry VII, Count (1600–1603)

Pappenheim (complete list) –
William, Lord (1482–1508)
Joachim, Lord (1508–1536)
Wolfgang I, Lord (1536–1558)
Christopher, Lord (1558–1569)
Wolfgang II, Lord (1558–1585)
Philip, Lord (1558–1619)

Prince-Bishopric of Passau (complete list) –
Wiguleus Fröschl of Marzoll, Prince-Bishop (1500–1517)
Ernest of Bavaria, Administrator (1517–1541)
Wolfgang of Salm, Prince-Bishop (1541–1555)
Wolfgang of Closen, Prince-Bishop (1555–1561)
Urban of Trennbach, Prince-Bishop (1561–1598)
Leopold V, Archduke of Austria, Prince-Bishop (1598–1625)

Palatinate-Sulzbach –
Otto Henry, Count (1569–1604)

Prince-Bishopric of Regensburg (complete list) –
Rupert II, Prince-bishop (1492–1507)
John III of the Palatinate, Prince-bishop (1507–1538)
Pankraz von Sinzenhofen, Prince-bishop (1538–1548)
Georg von Pappenheim, Prince-bishop (1548–1563)
Vitus von Fraunberg, Prince-bishop (1563–1567)
David Kölderer von Burgstall, Prince-bishop (1567–1579)
Philipp von Bayern, Prince-bishop (1579–1598)
Sigmund von Fugger, Prince-bishop (1598–1600)
Wolfgang II von Hausen, Prince-bishop (1600–1613)

Prince-Archbishopric of Salzburg (complete list) –
Leonhard von Keutschach, Prince-archbishop (1495–1519)
Matthäus Lang von Wellenburg, Prince-archbishop (1519–1540)
Ernest of Bavaria, Prince-archbishop (1540–1554)
Michael of Khuenburg, Prince-archbishop (1554–1560)
John Jacob of Khun-Bellasy, Prince-archbishop (1560–1586)
George of Kuenburg, Prince-archbishop (1586–1587)
Wolf Dietrich von Raitenau, Prince-archbishop (1587–1612)

Bohemian and Hungary

Bohemia, Hungary

Kingdom of Bohemia, Kingdom of Hungary (1301–1526)/(1526–1867), Margraviate of Moravia (complete list, complete list, complete list) –	
Vladislaus II, King of Bohemia (1471–1516), of Hungary (1490–1516), Margrave (1490–1516)
Louis II, King, Margrave (1516–1526)
John, contested King of Hungary (1526–1540)	
John Sigismund, contested King of Hungary (1540–1551, 1556–1570)	
Ferdinand I, King (1526–1564), Margrave (1527–1564)
Maximilian II, King of Bohemia (1562–1576), of Hungary, Margrave (1564–1576)
Rudolph II, King of Bohemia (1576–1611), of Hungary, Margrave (1576–1608)

Duchy of Cieszyn (Teschen) (complete list) –
Casimir II, Duke (1477–1528)
Wenceslaus II, Duke (1518–1524)
Wenceslaus III Adam, Duke (1528–1579)
Adam Wenceslaus, Duke (1579–1617)

Burgundian-Low Countries

County of Artois (complete list) –
For the preceding rulers, see the County of Artois under the List of state leaders in the 15th century
Philip I of Castile, Count (1482–1506)
Charles V, Holy Roman Emperor, Count (1506–1556)
under the Pragmatic Sanction of 1549 Charles V united Artois with the other lordships of the Low Countries
Philip II of Spain, Count (1556–1598)
Isabella Clara Eugenia, Countess, and Albert, Count (1598–1621)

County of Burgundy (complete list) –
Philip VI the Handsome, Count (1482–1506)
Charles II, Count (1506–1556)
Philip VII, Count (1556–1598)
Isabella Clara Eugenia, Countess, and Albert, Count (1598–1621)

Duchy of Brabant (complete list) –
Philip III, Duke (1494–1506)
Charles II, Duke (1506–1555)
Philip IV, Duke (1555–1598)
Isabella Clara Eugenia, Duchess, Albert, Duke (1598–1621)

County of Drenthe (complete list) –
For the preceding rulers, see the County of Drenthe under the #Lower Rhenish–Westphalian
Jean de Ligne, Stadtholder (1549–1568)
Charles de Brimeu, Stadtholder (1568–1572)
Gillis of Berlaymont, Stadtholder (1572–1574)
Caspar de Robles, Stadtholder (1574–1576)
George de Lalaing, Stadtholder (1576–1581)
For the succeeding rulers, see the County of Drenthe under the List of state leaders in the 16th century

County of Flanders (complete list) –
Philip IV the Handsome, Count (1482–1506)
Charles III, Count (1506–1555)
Philip V, Count (1555–1598)
Isabella Clara Eugenia, Countess (1598–1621)

Lordship of Frisia (complete list) –
Floris van Egmont, Stadtholder (1515–1518)
Wilhelm von Roggendorf, Stadtholder (1518–1521)
Georg Schenck van Tautenburg, Stadtholder (1521–1540)
Jancko Douwama, Frisian rebel/ Stadtholder (1522–?)
Maximiliaan van Egmond, Stadtholder (1559–1548)
Jean de Ligne, Stadtholder (1559–1568)
Charles de Brimeu, Stadtholder (1568–1572)
Gillis van Berlaymont, Stadtholder (1572–1574)
Caspar de Robles, Stadtholder (1574–1576)
George de Lalaing, Stadtholder (1576–1581)
For the succeeding rulers, see the Lordship of Frisia under the List of state leaders in the 16th century

Lordship of Groningen (complete list) –
For the preceding rulers, see the Lordship of Groningen under the #Lower Rhenish–Westphalian
Jean de Ligne, Stadtholder (1549–1568)
Charles de Brimeu, Stadtholder (1568–1572)
Gillis van Berlaymont, Stadtholder (1572–1574)
Caspar de Robles, Stadtholder (1574–1576)
George de Lalaing, Stadtholder (1576–1581)
For the succeeding rulers, see the Lordship of Groningen under the List of state leaders in the 16th century

Duchy of Guelders
For the preceding rulers, see the Duchy of Guelders under the #Lower Rhenish–Westphalian
Dukes (complete list) –
under the Pragmatic Sanction of 1549 Charles V united Guelders with the other lordships of the Low Countries
Charles V, Duke (1543–1555)
Philip II, Duke (1555–1598)
Stadtholders (complete list) –
Philip de Lalaing, Stadtholder (1544–1555)
Philip de Montmorency, Stadtholder (1555–1560)
Karel van Brimeu, Stadtholder (1560–1572)
Gillis van Berlaymont, Stadtholder (1572–1577)
Johann VI, Stadtholder (1578–1581)
For the succeeding rulers, see the Duchy of Guelders under the List of state leaders in the 16th century

Upper Guelders (complete list) –
For the preceding rulers, see the Upper Guelders under the #Lower Rhenish–Westphalian
Jan van Argenteau, Stadtholder (1579–1589)
Marcus de Rye de la Palud, Stadtholder (1589–1592)
Charles of Ligne, Stadtholder (1592–1593)
Herman van den Bergh, Stadtholder (1593–1611)

County of Hainaut (complete list) –
Philip I de Croÿ, Stadtholder (1482–1511)
Charles I de Croÿ, Stadtholder (1511–1521)
Philip II de Croÿ, Stadtholder (1521–1549)
Charles II de Lalaing, Stadtholder (1549–1558)
Charles de Brimeu, Stadtholder (1558–1560)
John IV of Glymes, Stadtholder (1560–1566)
Philip of Noircarmes, Stadtholder (1566–1574)
Philip de Lalaing, Stadtholder (1574–1582)
Emanuel Philibert de Lalaing, Stadtholder (1582–1590)
Charles III de Croÿ, Stadtholder (1592–1606)

County of Holland and County of Zeeland
Counts (complete list) –
under the Pragmatic Sanction of 1549 Charles V united Holland with the other lordships of the Low Countries
Philip II the Handsome, Count (1494–1506)
Charles II, Count (1515–1555)
Philip III, Count (1555–1581)
Stadtholders (complete list) –
Jan III van Egmond, Stadtholder (1483–1515)
Henry III of Nassau-Breda, Stadtholder (1515–1521)
Antoon I van Lalaing, Stadtholder (1522–1540)
René of Châlon, Stadtholder (1540–1544)
Louis of Flanders, Stadtholder (1544–1546)
Maximilian of Burgundy, Stadtholder (1547–1558)
William I, Stadtholder (1559–1567)
Maximilien de Hénin, Stadtholder (1567–1573)
Philip of Noircarmes, Stadtholder (1573–1574)
Gillis van Berlaymont, Stadtholder (1574–1577)
William I, Stadtholder (1572–1584)
Grand pensionaries (complete list) –
Frans Coebel van der Loo, Grand Pensionary (1500–1513)
Albrecht van Loo, Grand Pensionary (1513–1524)
Aert van der Goes, Grand Pensionary (1525–1544)
Adriaen van der Goes, Grand Pensionary (1544–1560)
Jacob van den Eynde, Grand Pensionary (1560–1568)
Paulus Buys, Grand Pensionary (1572–1584)
Johan van Oldenbarnevelt, Grand Pensionary (1586–1619)
For the succeeding rulers, look under the List of state leaders in the 16th century

Duchy of Limburg (complete list) –
Philip III the Handsome, Duke (1482–1506)
Charles II, Duke (1506–1555)
under the Pragmatic Sanction of 1549 Charles V united Limburg with the other lordships of the Low Countries
Philip IV, Duke (1555–1598)
Isabella, Duchess, and Albert, Duke (1598–1621)

Duchy of Luxembourg
For the preceding rulers, see the Duchy of Luxemburg under the #Lower Rhenish–Westphalian
Dukes (complete list) –
under the Pragmatic Sanction of 1549 Charles V united Luxembourg with the other lordships of the Low Countries
Philip III, Duke (1556–1598)
Isabella Clara Eugenia, Duchess, and Albert, Duke (1598–1621)
Stadtholders (complete list) –
Peter Ernst I von Mansfeld-Vorderort, Stadtholder (1545–1552, 1559–1604)
Maarten van Rossum, Stadtholder (1552–1555)
Charles de Brimeu, Stadtholder (1556–1558)

County of Namur (complete list) –
Maximilian, Margrave (1493–1519)
Charles II, Margrave (1519–1556)
under the Pragmatic Sanction of 1549 Charles V united Namur with the other lordships of the Low Countries
Philip V, Margrave (1556–1598)
Isabella Clara Eugenia, Margravine (1598–1621)

Lordship of Overijssel (complete list) –
For the preceding rulers, see the Lordship of Overijssel under the #Lower Rhenish–Westphalian
Jean de Ligne, Stadtholder (1548–1568)
Charles de Brimeu, Stadtholder (1568–1572)
Gillis van Berlaymont, Stadtholder (1572–1573)
Caspar de Robles, Stadtholder (1573–1576)
George de Lalaing, Stadtholder (1576–1581)
For the succeeding rulers, see the Lordship of Overijssel under the List of state leaders in the 16th century

Lordship of Utrecht
Lords –
Charles II, Count (1528–1555)
under the Pragmatic Sanction of 1549 Charles V united Utrecht with the other lordships of the Low Countries
Philip III, Count (1555–1581)
Stadtholders (complete list) –
Antoon I van Lalaing, Stadtholder (1528–1540)
René of Châlon, Stadtholder (1540–1544)
Louis of Flanders, Stadtholder (1544–1546)
Maximilian of Burgundy, Stadtholder (1547–1558)
For the succeeding rulers, see the Lordship of Utrecht under the #Burgundian-Low Countries

Franconian

Prince-Bishopric of Bamberg (complete list) –
Heinrich Groß von Trockau, Prince-bishop (1487–1501)
Veit Truchseß von Pommersfelden, Prince-bishop (1501–1503)
Georg Marschalk von Ebnet, Prince-bishop (1503–1505)
Georg Schenk von Limpurg, Prince-bishop (1505–1522)
Weigand von Redwitz, Prince-bishop (1522–1556)
Georg Fuchs von Rügheim, Prince-bishop (1556–1561)
Veit von Würzburg, Prince-bishop (1561–1577)
Johann Georg Zobel von Giebelstadt, Prince-bishop (1577–1580)
Martin von Eyb, Prince-bishop (1580–1583)
Ernst von Mengersdorf, Prince-bishop (1583–1591)
Neytard von Thüngen, Prince-bishop (1591–1598)
Johann Philipp von Gebsattel, Prince-bishop (1599–1609)

Brandenburg-Ansbach (complete list) –
Frederick the Elder, Margrave of Brandenburg-Ansbach (1486–1536), of Brandenburg-Kulmbach (1495–1515)
George I the Pious, Regent of Brandenburg-Kulmbach (1527–1541), Margrave of Brandenburg-Ansbach (1536–1543)
Joachim II Hector, Elector of Brandenburg, Regent (1543–c.1548)
Philip I, Landgrave of Hesse, Regent (1543–c.1548)
John Frederick I, Elector of Saxony, Regent (1543–1547)
Maurice, Elector of Saxony, Regent (1547–c.1548)
George Frederick I, Margrave of Brandenburg-Ansbach (1543–1603), of Brandenburg-Kulmbach (1553–1603)

Brandenburg-Kulmbach (Brandenburg-Bayreuth) (complete list) –
Frederick the Elder, Margrave of Brandenburg-Ansbach (1486–1536), of Brandenburg-Kulmbach (1495–1515)
Casimir, Margrave (1515–1527)
George I the Pious, Regent of Brandenburg-Kulmbach (1527–1541), Margrave of Brandenburg-Ansbach (1536–1543)
Albert Alcibiades, Margrave (1527–1553)
George Frederick I, Margrave of Brandenburg-Ansbach (1543–1603), of Brandenburg-Kulmbach (1553–1603)

County of Castell (complete list) –
George I, Count (1498–1528)
Wolfgang I, Count (1498–1546)
Conrad II, Count (1546–1577)
Frederick XI, Count (1546–1552)
Henry IV, Count (1546–1595)
George II, Count (1546–1597)
partitioned into Castell-Remlingen and Castell-Rüdenhausen

Prince-Bishopric of Eichstätt (complete list, de) –
, Prince-bishop (1496–1535)
, Prince-bishop (1535–1539)
, Prince-bishop (1539–1552)
, Prince-bishop (1552–1560)
, Prince-bishop (1560–1590)
, Prince-bishop (1590–1595)
Johann Konrad von Gemmingen, Prince-bishop (1595–1612)

Hohenlohe-Neuenstein –
Ludwig Kasimir, Count (1551–1568)
Albrecht, co-Count (1568–c.1586)
Friedrich, co-Count of Hohenlohe-Neuenstein (1568–1586), Count of Hohenlohe-Langenburg (1586–1590)
Philipp, co-Count of Hohenlohe-Neuenstein (1568–1586), Count (1586–1606)
Wolfgang, co-Count of Hohenlohe-Neuenstein (1568–1586), Count of Hohenlohe-Weikersheim (1586–1606),  of Hohenlohe-Neuenstein (1586–1610)

Hohenlohe-Waldenburg-Pfedelbach –
Ludwig Eberhard of Hohenlohe-Waldenburg-Pfedelbach (1600–1650)

Hohenlohe-Weikersheim –
Kraft VI, Count (1472–1503)
Georg, Count (1503–1551)
Eberhard von Hohenlohe-Waldenburg, Count (1551–1570)
Wolfgang, co-Count of Hohenlohe-Neuenstein (1568–1586), Count of Hohenlohe-Weikersheim (1586–1606),  of Hohenlohe-Neuenstein (1586–1610)
Georg Friedrich I. von Hohenlohe-Waldenburg, Count (1570–1600)
Georg Friedrich II, Count (1600–1635)

Prince-Bishopric of Würzburg (complete list) –
Lorenz von Bibra, Prince-bishop (1495–1519)
Konrad von Thüngen, Prince-bishop (1519–1540)
Conrad von Bibra, Prince-bishop (1540–1544)
Melchior Zobel von Giebelstadt, Prince-bishop (1544–1558)
Friedrich von Wirsberg, Prince-bishop (1558–1573)
Julius Echter von Mespelbrunn, Prince-bishop (1573–1617)

Electoral Rhenish

Arenberg (complete list) –
Margaret, Countess (1544–1576), Princely Countess (1576–1599), and Jean de Ligne, Count (1547–1568)
Charles, Princely Count (1599–1616)

Elector-Archbishopric of Cologne (complete list) –
Hermann IV of Hesse, Archbishop-elector (1480–1508)
Philip II of Daun-Oberstein, Archbishop-elector (1508–1515)
Hermann V von Wied, Archbishop-elector (1515–1546)
Adolf III of Schauenburg, Archbishop-elector (1546–1556)
Anton of Schauenburg, Archbishop-elector (1556–1558)
Gebhard I von Mansfeld-Vorderort, Archbishop-elector (1558–1562)
Friedrich IV of Wied, Archbishop-elector (1562–1567)
Salentin von Isenburg-Grenzau, Archbishop-elector (1567–1577)
Gebhard II Truchsess von Waldburg, Archbishop-elector (1577–1583)
Ernest of Bavaria, Archbishop-elector (1583–1612)

Elector-Bishopric of Mainz (complete list) –
Berthold von Henneberg, Archbishop-elector (1484–1504)
Jakob von Liebenstein, Archbishop-elector (1504–1508)
Uriel von Gemmingen, Archbishop-elector (1508–1514)
Albert of Brandenburg, Archbishop-elector (1514–1545)
Sebastian von Heusenstamm, Archbishop-elector (1545–1555)
Daniel Brendel von Homburg, Archbishop-elector (1555–1582)
Wolfgang von Dalberg, Archbishop-elector (1582–1601)

Nieder-Isenburg (Lower Isenburg) (complete list) –
Gerlach II, Count (1488–1502)
Heinrich, Count (1521/22–1553)
Johann Heinrich, Count (c.1565)
Arnold, Count (?–1577)
Salentin VIII, Count (1577–1610)

Electoral Palatinate (complete list) –
Palatinate-Neuburg
Palatinate-Simmern
Palatinate-Veldenz
Palatinate-Veldenz-Gutenberg
Palatinate-Veldenz-Lützelstein
Palatinate-Zweibrücken
Palatinate-Zweibrücken-Birkenfeld
Palatinate-Zweibrücken-Vohenstrauss-Parkstein
Philip I the Upright, Elector (1476–1508)
John I, Count Palatine of Simmern (1480–1509)
Alexander I the Lame, Count Palatine of Zweibrücken (1489–1514)
Philip I the Warlike, co-Count Palatine of Neuburg (1505–1541)
Otto Henry I the Magnanimous, Count Palatine of Neuburg (1505–1557)
Louis V the Pacific, Elector (1508–1544)
John II, Count Palatine of Simmern (1509–1557)
Louis II the Younger, Count Palatine of Zweibrücken (1514–1532)
Robert I, Count Palatine of Zweibrücken (1532–1543)
Robert I, Count Palatine of Veldenz (1543–1544)
Wolfgang I, Count Palatine of Zweibrücken (1532–1569)
Wolfgang I, Count Palatine of Neuburg (1557–1569)
Frederick III the Wise, Elector (1544–1556)
George John I the Astute, Count Palatine of Veldenz (1560–1592)
Otto Henry I the Magnanimous, Elector (1556–1559)
Frederick III the Pious, Count Palatine of Simmern (1557–1559)
Frederick III the Pious, Elector (1559–1576)
George, Count Palatine of Simmern (1559–1569)
Richard, Count Palatine of Simmern (1569–1598)
John I the Lame, Count Palatine of Zweibrücken (1569–1604)
Frederick I, Count Palatine of Zweibrücken-Vohenstrauss-Parkstein (1569–1597)
Otto Henry, Count Palatine of Sulzbach (1569–1604)
Charles I, Count Palatine of Zweibrücken-Birkenfeld (1569–1600)
Philip Louis, Count Palatine of Neuburg (1569–1604)
Louis VI the Careless, Elector (1576–1583)
Frederick IV the Righteous, Elector (1583–1610)
Anna of Sweden, Regent (1592–1598)
George Gustavus, Count Palatine of Veldenz (1598–1634)
John Augustus, Count Palatine of Veldenz-Lützelstein (1598–1611)
Louis Philip I, Count Palatine of Veldenz-Gutenberg (1598–1601)
George John II, Count Palatine of Veldenz-Gutenberg (1598–1654)

County of Schaumburg (complete list) –
, Count (1492–1510)
, Count (1510–1526)
, Count (1526–1527)
Jobst I, Count (1527–1531)
, Count (1531–1560)
, Count (1531–1581)
Otto IV, Count (1544–1576)
, Count (1576–1601)

Elector-Bishopric of Trier (complete list) –
Johann II of Baden, Archbishop-elector (1456–1503)
Jakob von Baden, Archbishop-elector (1503–1511)
Richard von Greiffenklau zu Vollrads, Archbishop-elector (1511–1531)
Johann von Metzenhausen, Archbishop-elector (1531–1540)
Johann Ludwig von Hagen, Archbishop-elector (1540–1547)
John of Isenburg-Grenzau, Archbishop-elector (1547–1556)
Johann von der Leyen, Archbishop-elector (1556–1567)
Jakob von Eltz-Rübenach, Archbishop-elector (1567–1581)
Johann von Schönenberg, Archbishop-elector (1581–1599)
Lothar von Metternich, Archbishop-elector (1599–1623)

Lower Rhenish–Westphalian

Bentheim-Bentheim (complete list) –
Eberwin II, Count (1473–1530)

Bentheim-Lingen (complete list) –
Otto, Count (1450–1508)
Nicholas III, Count (1493–1508)
Nicholas IV, Count (1508–1541)
Conrad, Count (1541–1547)
Maximilian, Count (1547–1548)
Anna, Count (1548–1555)

Bentheim-Steinfurt (complete list) –
Arnold II, Count (1498–1544)
Eberwin III, Count (1544–1562)
Arnold III, Count (1562–1606)
Anna of Tecklenburg, Regent (1562–1577)

Bentheim-Tecklenburg (complete list) –
Otto VIII, Count (1493–1526)
Conrad of Bentheim-Lingen, Count (1526–1557)

Bentheim-Tecklenburg(-Rheda) (complete list, complete list) –
Arnold III, Count of Bentheim-Tecklenburg (1562–1606)

Prince-Archbishopric of Bremen (complete list) –
John Frederick, Prince-archbishop (1596–1634)

Duchy of Cleves, County of Mark (complete list, complete list) –
John II the Pious, Duke of Cleves, Countof Mark (1481–1521)
John III the Peaceful, Duke of Cleves, Count of Mark (1521–1539)
William the Rich, Duke of Cleves, Count of Mark (1539–1592)
John William, Duke of Cleves, Count of Mark (1592–1609)

Princely Abbey of Corvey (de:complete list) –
Hermann III von Bömelberg, Prince-abbot (1479–1504)
, Prince-abbot (1504–1547)
Kaspar I von Hörsel, Prince-abbot (1547–1555)
, Prince-abbot (1555–1585)
Dietrich IV. von Beringhausen, Prince-abbot (1585–1616)

County of Drenthe (complete list) –
Georg Schenck van Toutenburg, Stadtholder (1536–1540)
Maximilian of Egmont, Stadtholder (1540–1548)
For the succeeding rulers, see the County of Drenthe under the #Burgundian-Low Countries

Essen Abbey (complete list) –
Meina von Daun-Oberstein, Princess-Abbess (1489–1521)
Margarete II von Beichlingen, Princess-Abbess (1521–1534)
Sibylle von Montfort, Princess-Abbess (1534–1551)
Katharina von Tecklenburg, Princess-Abbess (1551–1560)
Maria von Spiegelberg, Princess-Abbess (1560–1561)
Irmgard von Diepholz, Princess-Abbess (1561–1575)
Elisabeth VI von Manderscheid-Blankenheim-Gerolstein, Princess-Abbess (1575–1578)
Elisabeth VII von Sayn, Princess-Abbess (1578–1588)
Elisabeth VIII von Manderscheid-Blankenheim, Princess-Abbess (1588–1598)
Margarete Elisabeth von Manderscheid-Blankenheim, Princess-Abbess (1598–1604)

County of East Frisia (complete list) –
Edzard I the Great, Count (1491–1528)
Enno II, Count (1528–1540)
Anna of Oldenburg, Regent (1540–1561)
Johan II, Count (1561–1591)
Edzard II, Count (1561–1599)
Enno III, Count (1599–1625)

Lordship of Groningen (complete list) –
Cristoffel van Meurs, Stadtholder (1519–1522)
Jasper van Marwijck, Stadtholder (1522–1530)
Charles of Guelders, Stadtholder (1530–1536)
Ludolf Coenders, Stadtholder (1536–?)
Georg Schenck van Toutenburg, Stadtholder (1536–1540)
Maximiliaan van Egmond, Stadtholder (1540–1548)
For the succeeding rulers, see the Lordship of Groningen under the #Burgundian-Low Countries

Duchy of Guelders (complete list) –
Charles II, Duke (1492–1538)
William II, Duke (1538–1543)
Charles V, Duke (1543–1555)
For the succeeding rulers, see the Duchy of Guelders under the #Burgundian-Low Countries

Duchy of Guelders (complete list) –
Guelders independent (1492–1504)
John V of Nassau-Siegen, Stadtholder (1504–1505)
Philip of Burgundy, Stadtholder (1505–1507)
Floris van Egmond, Stadtholder (1507–1511)
Guelders independent, Stadtholder (1511–1543)
René of Châlon, Stadtholder (1543–1544)
Philip de Lalaing, Stadtholder (1544–1555)
For the succeeding rulers, see the Upper Groningen under the #Burgundian-Low Countries

Upper Guelders (complete list) –
Reinier of Guelders, Stadtholder (1502–1522)
For the succeeding rulers, see the Upper Groningen under the #Burgundian-Low Countries

Herford Abbey (complete list) –
Bonizet of Limburg-Stirum, Abbess (1494–1524)
Anna II of Limburg, Abbess (1524–1565)
Margaret II of Lippe, Abbess (1565–1578)
Felicitas I of Eberstein, Abbess (1578–1586)
Magdalene I of Lippe, Abbess (1586–1604)

Prince-Bishopric of Liège (complete list) –
John of Hornes, Prince-Bishop (1484–1505)
Érard de La Marck, Prince-Bishop (1505–1538)
Corneille of Berghes, Prince-Bishop (1538–1544)
George of Austria, Prince-Bishop (1544–1557)
Robert of Berghes, Prince-Bishop (1557–1564)
Gerard van Groesbeeck, Prince-Bishop (1564–1580)
Ernest of Bavaria, Prince-Bishop (1581–1612)

Limburg-Broich (complete list) –
John, Count (1473–1508)

County of Lippe (complete list) –
Simon V, Lord (1511–1528), Count (1528–1536)
Bernhard VIII, Count (1536–1563)
Simon VI, Count (1563–1613)

Duchy of Luxemburg
Dukes (complete list) –
Philip II, Duke (1482–1506)
Charles III, Duke (1506–1556)
Stadtholders (complete list) –
Philip I de Croÿ, Stadtholder (?–1511)
Peter Ernst I von Mansfeld-Vorderort, Stadtholder (1545–1552, 1559–1604)
For the succeeding rulers, see the Duchy of Luxemburg under the #Burgundian-Low Countries

Prince-Bishopric of Münster (complete list) –
Conrad II of Rietberg, Prince-bishop (1497–1508)
Eric II of Saxe-Lauenburg, Prince-bishop (1508–1522)
Frederick III, Prince-bishop (1522–1532)
Eric of Brunswick-Grubenhagen, Prince-bishop (1532–1532)
Francis von Waldeck, Prince-bishop (1532–1553)
William of Ketteler, Prince-bishop (1553–1557)
Bernhard of Raesfeld, Prince-bishop (1557–1566)
John II of Hoya, Prince-bishop (1566–1574)
John William, Prince-bishop (1574–1585)
Ernest of Bavaria, Prince-bishop (1585–1612)

County of Oldenburg (complete list) –
John V, Count (1500–1526)
John VI, Count (1526–1529)
George, Count (1526–1529)
Christopher, Count (1526–1566)
Anthony I, Count (1526–1573)
John VII, Count (1573–1603)
Anthony II, Count of Oldenburg-Delmenhorst, Count (1573–1619)

Prince-Bishopric of Osnabrück (complete list) –
, Prince-bishop (1482–1508)
Eric of Brunswick-Grubenhagen, Prince-bishop (1508–1532)
Franz von Waldeck, Prince-bishop (1532–1553)
Johann IV of Osnabrück, Prince-bishop (1553–1574)
Henry of Saxe-Lauenburg, Prince-bishop (1574–1585)
Bernhard von Waldeck, Prince-bishop (1585–1591)
Philip Sigismund, Prince-bishop (1591–1623)

Lordship of Overijssel
Lords –
Charles II, Count (1528–1555)
under the Pragmatic Sanction of 1549 Charles V united Overijssel with the other lordships of the Low Countries
Philip III, Count (1555–1581)
Stadtholders (complete list) –
Georg Schenck van Toutenburg, Stadtholder (1528–1540)
Maximiliaan van Egmond, Stadtholder (1540–1548)
For the succeeding rulers, see the Lordship of Overijssel under the #Burgundian-Low Countries

Prince-Bishopric of Paderborn (complete list) –
Hermann von Hessen, Prince-bishop (1498–1508)
Hermann of Wied, Prince-bishop (1532–1547)
Rembert of Kerssenbrock, Prince-bishop (1547–1568)
John II, Bishop of Paderborn, Prince-bishop (1568–1574)
Salentin of Isenburg, Prince-bishop (1574–1577)
Henry IV of Saxe-Lauenburg, Prince-bishop (1577–1585)
Dietrich IV, Bishop of Paderborn, Prince-bishop (1585–1618)

County of Runkel (complete list) –
John, Count (1460–1521)

County of Sayn (complete list) –
Gerard III, co-Count (1493–1506)
Sebastian I, Count (1493–1598)
John IV, co-Count (1498–1529)
John V, co-Count (1529–1560)
Sebastian II, co-Count (1529–1573)
Adolph, co-Count (1560–1568)
Herman, co-Count (1560–1571)
Henry IV, co-Count (1560–1606)

Prince-Bishopric of Utrecht (complete list) –
Frederick IV of Baden, Prince-bishop (1496–1517)
Philip of Burgundy (1517–1524)
Henry of the Palatinate, Prince-bishop (1524–1528)

Lordship of Utrecht
Lords –
Charles II, Count (1528–1555)
under the Pragmatic Sanction of 1549 Charles V united Utrecht with the other lordships of the Low Countries
Philip III, Count (1555–1581)
Stadtholders (complete list) –
Antoon I van Lalaing, Stadtholder (1528–1540)
René of Châlon, Stadtholder (1540–1544)
Louis of Flanders, Stadtholder (1544–1546)
Maximilian of Burgundy, Stadtholder (1547–1558)
For the succeeding rulers, see the Lordship of Utrecht under the #Burgundian-Low Countries

Prince-Bishopric of Verden (complete list) –
Christopher the Spendthrift, Prince-Bishop (1502–1558)
George of Brunswick and Lunenburg (Wolfenbüttel), Prince-Bishop (1558–1566)
Eberhard of Holle, Prince-Bishop (1566–1586)
Philip Sigismund of Brunswick and Lunenburg (Wolfenbüttel), Prince-Bishop (1586–1623)

County of Wied (complete list) –
William III, Count (1487–1526)
John I, Count (1487–1533)
Philip, Count (1533–1535)
John II, Count (1535–1581)
Herman I, Count (1581–1591)
William IV, Count (1581–1612)
Herman II, Count (1581–1631)

County of Wied (complete list) –
William III, Count (1487–1526)
John I, Count (1526–1533)
Philip, Count (1533–1535)
John II, Count (1535–1581)
Herman I, co-Count (1581–1591)
William IV, co-Count (1581–1612)
Herman II, Count (1581–1631)

Upper Rhenish

Duchy of Bar (complete list) –
René II, Duke (1483–1508)

Prince-Bishopric of Basel (complete list) –
Caspar von Mühlhausen, Prince-bishop (1479–1502)
Christoph von Utenheim, Prince-bishop (1502–1527)
Philippe von Gundelsheim, Prince-bishop (1527–1533)
Melchior von Lichtenfels, Prince-bishop (1554–1575)
Jakob Christoph Blarer von Wartensee, Prince-bishop (1575–1608)

Free City of Frankfurt (de:complete list) –
Johann von Martorf, Senior Mayor (1599–1600)
Johann Ludwig von Glauburg, Senior Mayor (1600–1601)

Princely Abbey of Fulda (complete list) –
, Prince-abbot (1472–1513)
, Prince-abbot (1513–1521/29)
, Prince-abbot (1521/29–1541)
, Prince-abbot (1541–1550)
Wolfgang Dietrich von Eusigheim, Prince-abbot (1550–1558)
, Prince-abbot (1558–1567)
, Prince-abbot (1567–1568)
, Prince-abbot (1568–1570)
Balthasar von Dernbach, Prince-abbot (1570–1606, but exiled 1576–1602)
Julius Echter von Mespelbrunn, Administrator (1576–1602)

Landgraviate of Hesse (complete list) –
William III the Middle, Landgrave of Lower Hesse (1493–1500), of Hesse (1500–1509)
Philip I the Magnanimous, Landgrave (1509–1567)

Landgraviate of Hesse-Darmstadt (complete list) –
George I the Pious, Landgrave (1567–1596)
Louis VI the Faithful, Landgrave (1596–1626)

Landgraviate of Hesse-Kassel (complete list) –
William IV the Wise, Landgrave (1567–1592)
Maurice I the Learned, Landgrave (1592–1627)

Landgraviate of Hesse-Marburg –
Louis IV the Elder, Landgrave (1567–1604)

Landgraviate of Hesse-Rheinfels (complete list) –
Philip II the Younger, Landgrave (1567–1583)

Isenburg-Büdingen (complete list) –
Wolfgang Ernst I. von Isenburg-Büdingen, Count (1596–1633)

Isenburg-Grenzau (complete list) –
Gerlach III, Count (1502–1530)
Henry the Elder, Count (1530–1552)
Anthony, Count (1552–1554)
John, Count (1554–1556)
Arnold, Count (1556–1577)
Salentin VII, Count (1577–1610)

Isenburg-Neumagen (complete list) –
Salentin VI, Count (1502–1534)
Henry, Count (1534–1554)

Leiningen-Westerburg (complete list: de) –
Reinhard I, Count (?–1522)
Kuno II, Count (1522–1547)

Westerburg-Leiningen-Westerburg (de:complete list) –
Reinhard II, Count (1547–1584)
Albrecht Philipp, Count (1584–1597)
Johann Ludwig, Count (1597)

Westerburg-Leiningen-Leiningen (complete list: de) –
Philipp I, Count (1547–1597)
Louis, Count (1597–1622)

Leiningen-Schaumburg (de:complete list) –
George I, Count (1547–1586)
Philipp Jacob, Count (1586–1612)

Leiningen-Hardenburg (de:complete list) –
Emich VIII, Count (1495–1535)
Emich IX, Count (1535–1541)
Johann Philipp I, Count (1539–1562)
Emich XII, Count (1562–1607)

Duchy of Lorraine (complete list) –
René II, Duke (1473–1508)
Antoine, Duke (1508–1544)
Francis I, Duke (1544–1545)
Charles III, Duke (1545–1608)

County of Nassau-Beilstein –
John II, Count (1499–1513)
Henry V, co-Count (1513–1525)
John III, Count (1513–1561)

Nassau-Saarbrückeng (complete list) –
John Louis, Count (1472–1545)
Philip II, Count (1545–1554)
John III, Count (1554–1574)
Philip IV, Count (1574–1602)

Nassau-Weilburg (complete list) –
Louis I, Count (1492–1523)
Philip III, Count (1523–1559)
Albrecht, Count (1559–1593)
Philip IV, Count (1559–1602)

Lower Salm (complete list) –
Peter, Count (1479–1505)
John III, Count (1505–1537)
John IV, Count (1537–1559)
Werner, Count (1559–1629)

Salm-Badenweiler (complete list) –
John VI, Count (1451–1505)
John VII, Count (1505–1548)
John VIII, Count (1548–1600)

Salm-Blankenburg (complete list) –
Louis, Count (1443–1503)
Ulrick, Count (1503–1506)

Solms-Braunfels (complete list) –
Otto II, Count (1459–1504)
Bernhard III, Count (1504–1547)
Philipp, Count (1547–1581)
Konrad, Count (1581–1592)
Johann Albrecht I, Count (1592–1623)

Salm-Dhaun (complete list) –
Philip, Rhinegrave (1499–1521)
Philip Francis, Rhinegrave (1521–1561)
John Philip I, Rhinegrave (1561–1569)
Frederick, Rhinegrave (1569–1574)
Adolf Henry, Rhinegrave (1574–1606)

Salm-Neuweiler (complete list) –
Frederick I, Rhinegrave (1561–1610)

Salm-Salm (complete list) –
Friedrich I, Count (1574–1608)

Prince-Bishopric of Sion (complete list) –
Mathieu Schiner, Prince-Bishop (1499–1522)
Philippe am Hengart, Prince-Bishop (1522–1528)
Adrien I of Riedmatten, Prince-Bishop (1529–1545)
Jean Jordan, Prince-Bishop (1548–1565)
Hildebrand I of Riedmatten, Prince-Bishop (1565–1604)

Prince-Bishopric of Speyer (complete list) –
Ludwig of Helmstädt, Prince-bishop (1478–1504)
Philip I of Rosenberg, Prince-bishop (1504–1513)
George, Count Palatine by Rhine, Prince-bishop (1513–1529)
Philip II of Flersheim, Prince-bishop (1529–1552)
Rudolf of Frankenstein, Prince-bishop (1552–1560)
Marquard Freiherr of Hattstein, Prince-bishop (1560–1581)
Eberhard of Dienheim, Prince-bishop (1581–1610)

Prince-Bishopric of Strasbourg (complete list) –
Albrecht von Pfalz-Mosbach, Prince-Bishop (1478–1506)
Wilhelm III von Hohnstein, Prince-Bishop (1506–1541)
Erasmus Schenk von Limburg, Prince-Bishop (1541–1568)
Johann IV von Manderscheid, Prince-Bishop (1568–1592)
Johann Georg von Brandenburg, Prince-Bishop (1592–1604)

County of Waldeck-Landau, Newer Line –
John I, Count (1539–1567)
Philip VI, Count (1567–1579)
Francis III, Count (1579–1597)

County of Waldeck-Eisenberg –
Philip II, Regent (1475–1486), Count (1486–1524)
Philip III, Count (1524–1539)
Wolrad II, Count (1539–1578)
Josias I, Count (1578–1588)
Christian, Count of Waldeck-Eisenberg (1588–1607), of Waldeck-Wildungen (1607–1637)
Wolrad IV, Count (1588–1640)

County of Waldeck-Wildungen, Older Line –
Henry VIII, Count of Waldeck-Waldeck (1475–1486), of Waldeck-Wildungen (1486–1512)
Philipp IV, Count (1513–1574)
Daniel, Count (1574–1577)
Henry IX, Count (1577)
Günther, Count (1577–1585)
Wilhelm Ernst, Count (1585–1598)

Prince-Bishopric of Worms (complete list) –
Johann von Dalberg, Prince-bishop (1482–1503)
Reinhard von Rüppurr, Prince-bishop (1503–1523)
Henry of the Palatinate, Prince-bishop (1523–1552)
Dietrich von Rothenstein, Prince-bishop (1552–1580)
Georg von Schönenberg, Prince-bishop (1580–1595)
Philipp von Rothenstein, Prince-bishop (1595–1604)

Lower Saxon

Duchy/ Electorate of Saxony, Albertine (complete list) –
George I the Bearded, Duke (1500–1539)
Henry IV the Pious, Duke (1539–1541)
Maurice I, Duke (1541–1547), Elector (1547–1553)
Augustus, Elector of Saxony (1553–1586), Regent of Saxe-Weimar (1573–1586), Regent of Saxe-Coburg-Eisenach (1572–1586)
Christian I, Elector (1586–1591)
Sophie of Brandenburg, Regent (1591–c.1601)
Christian II, Elector (1591–1611), Regent of Saxe-Altenburg (1603–1611)

Saxe-Lauenburg (complete list) –
John V, co-Duke (1439–1507)
Magnus I, Duke (1507–1543)
Francis I, Duke (1543–1571, 1573/74–1581)
Magnus II, Duke (1571–1573/74)
Augustus, co-Vicegerent (1578–1581), co-Administrator (1581–1586), co-Duke (1586–1612)
Francis II, co-Vicegerent (1578–1581), co-Administrator (1581–1586), co-Duke (1586–1619)

Prince-Archbishopric of Bremen (complete list) –
John III, Prince-archbishop (1497–1511)
Christopher the Spendthrift, Prince-archbishop (1511–1542/1547, 1549–1558)
George of Brunswick and Lunenburg (Wolfenbüttel line), Prince-archbishop (1558–1566 )
Henry III, Prince-archbishop (1568–1585)
John Adolphus of Schleswig-Holstein-Gottorp, Prince-archbishop (1589–1596)
John Frederick, Prince-archbishop (1596–1634)

Principality of Brunswick-Wolfenbüttel/ Principality of Wolfenbüttel (complete list) –
Henry the Elder, Prince of Brunswick-Wolfenbüttel (1491–1514), co-Prince of Calenberg (1491–1494)
Henry V the Younger, Prince (1514–1568)
Julius, Prince of Brunswick-Wolfenbüttel (1568–1589), of Calenberg (1584–1589)
Henry Julius, Prince of Wolfenbüttel, of Calenberg (1589–1613), of Grubenhagen (1596–1613)

Principality of Calenberg (complete list) –
Eric I, co-Prince of Brunswick-Wolfenbüttel (1491–1494), Prince of Calenberg (1491–1540)
Eric II, Prince (1545–1584)
Julius, Prince of Brunswick-Wolfenbüttel (1568–1589), of Calenberg (1584–1589)
Henry Julius, Prince of Wolfenbüttel, of Calenberg (1589–1613), of Grubenhagen (1596–1613)

Gandersheim Abbey (complete list) –
Agnes III, Princess-Abbess (1485–1504)
Gertrud, Princess-Abbess (1504–1531)
Katharina, rival abbess (1504–1536)
Maria, Princess-Abbess (1532–1539)
Clara of Brunswick-Wolfenbüttel, Princess-Abbess (1539–1547)
Magdalena of Chlum, Princess-Abbess (1547–1577, 1577–1589)
Elisabeth, rival abbess (1577–1582)
Margarete of Warberg, rival abbess (1582–1587)
Anna Erica, Princess-Abbess (1589–1611)

Duchy of Gifhorn (complete list) –
Francis, co-Prince of Lüneburg (1536–1539), Prince of Gifhorn (1539–1549)

Principality of Grubenhagen (complete list) –
Henry IV, Prince (1479–1526)
Philip I, Prince (1486–1551)
Ernest III, Prince (1551–1567)
Wolfgang, Prince (1567–1595)
Philip II, Prince (1595–1596)
annexed by Brunswick-Wolfenbüttel

Free City of Hamburg (complete list) –
Johann Spreckelsen, Mayor (1512)
Nicolaus Thode, Mayor (1517)
Thidericus Hohusen, Mayor (1517)
Mayorship unoccupied (1519–1520), Dietrich Hohusen, Second Mayor (1517–1546)
Erhard vom Holte, Mayor (1520–1529)
Hinrich Salsborg, Mayor (1523)
Johann Hülpe, Mayor (1524)
Johann Wetken, Mayor (1529–1533)
Paul Grote, Mayor (1531)
Albert Westede, Mayor (1533–1538)
Johann Rodenborg, Mayor (1536)
Peter von Spreckelsen, Mayor (1538–1553)
Jürgen Plate, Mayor (1546)
Matthias Rheder, Mayor (1547)
Ditmar Koel, Mayor (1548)
Albert Hackmann, Mayor (1553–1580)
Mayorship unoccupied (1580–1581), Paul Grote, Second Mayor (1580–1584)
Lorenz Niebur, Mayor (1557)
Hermann Wetken, Mayor (1564)
Eberhard Moller, Mayor (1571)
Paul Grote, Mayor (1580)
Johann Niebur, Mayor (1557)
Nicolaus Vögeler, Mayor (1581)
Joachim vom Kape, Mayor (1588)
Diedrich von Eitzen, Mayor (1589)
Mayorship unoccupied (1590–1591), Joachim von Kape, Second Mayor (1588–1594)
Erich von der Fechte, Mayor (1591–1613)
Joachim Bekendorp, Mayor (1593)
Diederich vom Holte, Mayor (1595)
Vincent Moller, Mayor (1599)

Prince-Bishopric of Hildesheim (complete list) –
Berthold II of Landsberg, Prince-bishop (1481–1502)
Eric II of Saxe-Lauenburg, Prince-bishop (1503–1504)
John IV of Saxe-Lauenburg, Prince-bishop (1504–1527)
, Prince-bishop (1527–1531)
Otto IV of Schaumburg, Prince-bishop (1531–1537)
, Prince-bishop (1537–1551)
Frederick of Denmark, Prince-bishop (1551–1556)
, Prince-bishop (1557–1573)
Ernest II of Bavaria, Prince-bishop (1573–1612)

Duchy of Holstein
Dukes (complete list) –
John, Duke (1481–1513)
Christian II, Duke (1513–1523)
Frederick I, Duke (1523–1533)
Olav Engelbrektsson, Regent (1533–1537)
Christian III, Duke of Holstein (1533–1544), Duke of Holstein-Glückstadt (1544–1559)

Statholders (complete list) –
Johan Rantzau, Statholder (1523/45–1550)
Bertram von Ahlefeldt, Statholder (1550–1556)
Heinrich Rantzau, Statholder (1556–1598)

Schleswig-Holstein-Haderslev –
John II, Duke (1544–1580)

Holstein-Glückstadt
Dukes (complete list) –
Christian III, Duke of Holstein (1533–1544), Duke of Holstein-Glückstadt (1544–1559)
Frederick II, Duke (1559–1588)
Christian IV, Duke (1588–1648)
Statholders (complete list) –
Heinrich Rantzau, Statholder (1556–1598)
Geerd Rantzau, Statholder (1600–1627)

Holstein-Gottorp (complete list) –
Adolf, Duke (1544–1586)
Frederick II, Duke (1586–1587)
Philip, Duke (1587–1590)
John Adolf, Duke (1590–1616)

Holstein-Pinneberg (Holstein-Schaumburg) (complete list) –
, Count (1492–1510)
, Count (1510–1526)
, Count (1526–1527)
Jobst I, Count (1527–1531)
Adolph XIII, Count (1531–1544)
, Count (1531–1581)
Otto IV, Count (1544–1576)
, Count (1576–1601)

Prince-bishopric of Lübeck (complete list) –
Theodoric II, Prince-bishop (1492–1506)
Wilhem Westphal, Prince-bishop (1506–1509)
John VIII, Prince-bishop (1510–1523)
Henry III, Prince-bishop (1523–1535)
Detlev von Reventlow, Prince-bishop (1535–1535)
Balthasar Rantzau, Prince-bishop (1536–1547)
Jodokus Hodfilter, Prince-bishop (1547–1551)
Theodoric III, Prince-bishop (1551–1554)
sede vacante, Prince-bishop (1554–1556)
Andreas von Barby, Prince-bishop (1556–1559)
John IX, Prince-bishop (1559–1561)
Eberhard II, Prince-bishop (1561–1586)
John Adolf, Duke of Holstein-Gottorp, Prince-bishop (1586–1607)

Free City of Lübeck (complete list) –
, Mayor (1475–1501)
, Mayor (1487–1502)
, Mayor (1489–1501)
, Mayor (1498–1510)
, Mayor (1502–1511)
, Mayor (1501–1521)
, Mayor (1513–1520)
, Mayor (1503–1509)
, Mayor (1512)
, Mayor (1510–1528)
, Mayor (1511–1527)
, Mayor (1522–1530)
, Mayor (1520–1531; 1535–1543)
, Mayor (1531–1544)
, Mayor (1528–1532; 1534–1537)
, Mayor (1529–1531)
, Mayor (1531–1552)
, Mayor (1544–1560)
, Mayor (1540–1564)
, Mayor (1531–1532)
Jürgen Wullenwever, Mayor (1533–1535)
, Mayor (1533–1535)
, Mayor (1545–1549)
, Mayor (1560)
, Mayor (1551)
, Mayor (1564)
, Mayor (1553)
, Mayor (1560–1566)
, Mayor (1562)
, Mayor (1561)
, Mayor (1572)
, Mayor (1573)
, Mayor (1588)
, Mayor (1579–1594)
, Mayor (1571–1572)
, Mayor (1580–1589)
, Mayor (1581)
, Mayor (1589)
, Mayor (1594)
, Mayor (1589)
, Mayor (1599)
Jakob Bording, Mayor (1600–1616)

Principality of Lüneburg (complete list) –
Henry the Middle, Prince (1486–1520)
Otto of Harburg, co-Prince (1520–1527)
Ernest I the Confessor, co-Prince (1520–1527), Prince (1520–1546)
Francis, co-Prince of Lüneburg (1536–1539), Prince of Gifhorn (1539–1549)
Francis Otto, Prince (1555–1559)
Henry of Dannenberg, Prince (1559–1598)
William the Younger, Prince (1559–1592)
Ernest II, Prince (1592–1611)

Prince-Archbishopric of Magdeburg and of Halberstadt (complete list) –
Ernest II of Saxony, Prince-archbishop of Magdeburg (1475–1513), Administor of Halberstadt (1480–1513)
Albert IV of Brandenburg, Prince-archbishop, Administor (1513–1545)
John Albert of Brandenburg-Ansbach, Prince-archbishop, Administor (1545–1551)
Frederick IV of Brandenburg, Prince-archbishop, Administor (1551–1552)
Sigismund of Brandenburg, Prince-archbishop, Administor (1552–1566)
Joachim Frederick, Prince-archbishop (1566–1598)
Christian William of Brandenburg, Prince-archbishop (1598–1631)

Mecklenburg (complete list) –
Magnus II, co-Duke of Mecklenburg (1477–1479), of Mecklenburg-Schwerin (1479–1483), of Mecklenburg (1483–1503)
Balthasar, co-Duke of Mecklenburg-Schwerin (1479–1483), of Mecklenburg (1483–1507)
Eric II, co-Duke (1503–1508)
Albrecht VII the Handsome, co-Duke of Mecklenburg (1503–1520), Duke of Mecklenburg-Güstrow (1520–1547)
Henry V the Peaceful, co-Duke of Mecklenburg (1503–1520), Duke of Mecklenburg-Schwerin (1520–1552)

Duchy of Mecklenburg-Güstrow (complete list) –
Albrecht VII the Handsome, co-Duke of Mecklenburg (1503–1520), Duke of Mecklenburg-Güstrow (1520–1547)
John Albert I, Duke of Mecklenburg-Güstrow (1547–1552), Duke of Mecklenburg-Schwerin (1556–1576)
Ulrich I, Duke (1555–1603)

Duchy of Mecklenburg-Schwerin (complete list) –
Henry V the Peaceful, co-Duke of Mecklenburg (1503–1520), Duke of Mecklenburg-Schwerin (1520–1552)
Philip I, Duke (1552–1557)
John Albert I, Duke of Mecklenburg-Güstrow (1547–1552), Duke of Mecklenburg-Schwerin (1556–1576)
Johann VII, Duke (1576–1592)
John Albert II, co-Duke of Mecklenburg-Schwerin (1592–1621), -Güstrow (1610–1621), Duke of Mecklenburg-Güstrow (1621–1628, 1631–1636)
Adolf Frederick I, co-Duke of Mecklenburg-Schwerin (1592–1621), -Güstrow (1610–1621), Duke of Mecklenburg-Schwerin (1621–1628, 1631–1658)

County of Oldenburg (complete list) –
John V, Count (1500–1526)
John VI, Count (1526–1529)
George, Count (1526–1529)
Christopher, Count (1526–1566)
Anthony I, Count (1526–1573)
John VII, Count (1573–1603)
Anthony II, Count (1573–1619)

Upper Saxon

Electorate/ Duchy of Saxony, Ernestine (complete list) –
Frederick III the Wise, Elector (1486–1525)
John I the Steadfast, Elector (1525–1532)
John Frederick I, Elector (1532–1547), Duke (1547–1554)
John Frederick II, Duke (1554–1566)
Johann Wilhelm, Duke of Saxony (1566–1572), of Saxe-Weimar (1572–1573)

Saxe-Weimar (complete list) –
Johann Wilhelm, Duke of Saxony (1566–1572), of Saxe-Weimar (1572–1573)
Augustus, Elector of Saxony (1553–1586), Regent of Saxe-Weimar (1573–1586), Regent of Saxe-Coburg-Eisenach (1572–1586)
Friedrich Wilhelm I, Duke (1573–1602)

Saxe-Coburg-Eisenach (complete list) –
Augustus, Elector of Saxony (1553–1586), Regent of Saxe-Weimar (1573–1586), Regent of Saxe-Coburg-Eisenach (1572–1586)
John Casimir, co-Duke of Saxe-Coburg-Eisenach (1572–1596), Duke of Saxe-Coburg (1596–1633)
John Ernest I, co-Duke of Saxe-Coburg-Eisenach (1572–1596), Duke of Saxe-Eisenach (1596–1633), of Saxe-Coburg-Eisenach (1633–1638)

Saxe-Eisenach (complete list) –
John Ernest I, co-Duke of Saxe-Coburg-Eisenach (1572–1596), Duke of Saxe-Eisenach (1596–1633), of Saxe-Coburg-Eisenach (1633–1638)

Saxe-Coburg (complete list) –
John Casimir, co-Duke of Saxe-Coburg-Eisenach (1572–1596), Duke of Saxe-Coburg (1596–1633)

Anhalt-Dessau (complete list) –
George II the Strong, co-Prince (1474–1509)
Rudolph I the Valiant, co-Prince (1474–1510)
Ernest I, co-Prince (1474–1516)
Margaret of Münsterberg, Regent (1516–1524)
Joachim I, co-Prince (1516–1544), Prince (1544–1561)
John IV, co-Prince of Anhalt-Dessau (1524–1544), of Anhalt-Zerbst (1544–1551)
George III, co-Prince of Anhalt-Dessau (1524–1544), of Anhalt-Plötzkau (1544–1553)
Karl I, co-Prince of Anhalt-Zerbst (1551–1561), of Anhalt-Plötzkau (1553–1561)
Bernhard VII, co-Prince of Anhalt-Zerbst (1551–1570), of Anhalt-Plötzkau (1553–1570), of Anhalt-Dessau (1561–1570), of Anhalt-Köthen (1562–1570)
Joachim Ernest, co-Prince of Anhalt-Zerbst (1551–1570), of Anhalt-Plötzkau (1553–1570), of Anhalt-Dessau (1561–1570), of Anhalt-Köthen(1562–1570), Prince of Anhalt (1570–1586)

Anhalt-Köthen (complete list) –
Waldemar VI, co-Prince (1471–1508)
Adolph II, co-Prince (1475–1508)
Magnus, co-Prince (1475–1508), Prince (1475–1508)
Wolfgang the Confessor, Prince (1508–1562)
Joachim Ernest, co-Prince of Anhalt-Zerbst (1551–1570), of Anhalt-Plötzkau (1553–1570), of Anhalt-Dessau (1561–1570), of Anhalt-Köthen(1562–1570), Prince of Anhalt (1570–1586)

Anhalt-Plötzkau (complete list) –
George III, co-Prince of Anhalt-Dessau (1524–1544), of Anhalt-Plötzkau (1544–1553)
Karl I, co-Prince of Anhalt-Zerbst (1551–1561), of Anhalt-Plötzkau (1553–1561)
Bernhard VII, co-Prince of Anhalt-Zerbst (1551–1570), of Anhalt-Plötzkau (1553–1570), of Anhalt-Dessau (1561–1570), of Anhalt-Köthen (1562–1570)
Joachim Ernest, co-Prince of Anhalt-Zerbst (1551–1570), of Anhalt-Plötzkau (1553–1570), of Anhalt-Dessau (1561–1570), of Anhalt-Köthen(1562–1570), Prince of Anhalt (1570–1586)

Anhalt-Zerbst (complete list) –
John IV, co-Prince of Anhalt-Dessau (1524–1544), of Anhalt-Zerbst (1544–1551)
Karl I, co-Prince of Anhalt-Zerbst (1551–1561), of Anhalt-Plötzkau (1553–1561)
Bernhard VII, co-Prince of Anhalt-Zerbst (1551–1570), of Anhalt-Plötzkau (1553–1570), of Anhalt-Dessau (1561–1570), of Anhalt-Köthen (1562–1570)
Joachim Ernest, co-Prince of Anhalt-Zerbst (1551–1570), of Anhalt-Plötzkau (1553–1570), of Anhalt-Dessau (1561–1570), of Anhalt-Köthen(1562–1570), Prince of Anhalt (1570–1586)

Principality of Anhalt (complete list) –
Joachim Ernest, co-Prince of Anhalt-Zerbst (1551–1570), of Anhalt-Plötzkau (1553–1570), of Anhalt-Dessau (1561–1570), of Anhalt-Köthen(1562–1570), Prince of Anhalt (1570–1586)
, co-Prince of Anhalt (1586–1596)
John Ernest, co-Prince of Anhalt (1586–1601)
John George I, co-Prince of Anhalt (1586–1603), of Anhalt-Dessau (1603–1618)
Rudolph II, co-Prince of Anhalt (1586–1603), of Anhalt-Zerbst (1603–1621)
Christian I, co-Prince of Anhalt (1586–1603), of Anhalt-Bernburg (1603–1630)
Louis I, co-Prince of Anhalt (1586–1603), of Anhalt-Köthen (1603–1650)
Augustus, co-Prince of Anhalt (1586–1603), of Anhalt-Plötzkau (1603–1653), Regent of Anhalt-Zerbst (1621–1642), of Anhalt-Köthen (1650–1653)

Electorate of Brandenburg (complete list) –
Joachim I Nestor, Elector (1499–1535)
Joachim II Hector, Elector (1535–1571)
John George, Elector (1571–1598)
Joachim Frederick, Elector (1598–1608)

Brandenburg-Küstrin –
John VIII, Margrave (1535–1571)

Duchy of Pomerania, Pomerania-Wolgast, Pomerania-Barth (complete list) –
Bogislaw X the Great, Duke of Pomerania-Wolgast and Pomerania-Stettin (1474–1478), of Pomerania (1478–1523)
George I, co-Duke of Pomerania (1523–1531)
Barnim IX the Pious, co-Duke of Pomerania (1523–1532), Duke of Pomerania-Stettin (1532–1569)
Philip I the Pious, co-Duke of Pomerania (1531–1532), Duke of Pomerania-Wolgast (1532–1560)
Ernst Ludwig the Fair, co-Duke of Pomerania-Wolgast (1560–1569), Duke of Pomerania-Wolgast (1569–1592)
John Frederick the Strong, co-Duke of Pomerania-Wolgast (1560–1569), co-Duke of Pomerania-Stettin (1569–1600)
Barnim X the Younger, co-Duke of Pomerania-Wolgast (1560–1569), Duke of Pomerania-Rügenwalde (1569–1603), of Pomerania-Stettin (1600–1603)
Bogislaw XIII, co-Duke of Pomerania-Wolgast (1560–1569), co-Duke of Pomerania-Barth (1569–1603), of Pomerania-Stettin (1603–1606)
Philip Julius, Duke of Pomerania-Wolgast (1592–1625)

Pomerania-Stettin, Pomerania-Rügenwalde (complete list) –
Barnim IX the Pious, co-Duke of Pomerania (1523–1532), Duke of Pomerania-Stettin (1532–1569)
John Frederick the Strong, co-Duke of Pomerania-Wolgast (1560–1569), co-Duke of Pomerania-Stettin (1569–1600)
Barnim X the Younger, co-Duke of Pomerania-Wolgast (1560–1569), Duke of Pomerania-Rügenwalde (1569–1603), of Pomerania-Stettin (1600–1603)

Schwarzburg-Rudolstadt (complete list) –
Albrecht VII, Count (1574–1605)

Schwarzburg-Sondershausen (complete list) –
John Günther I, Count (1552–1586)
John Günther II, co-Count (1586–1631)
Anton Henry, co-Count (1586–1638)
Christian Günther I, co-Count (1586–1642)
, co-Count (1586–1643)

County of Stolberg (de:complete list) –
Heinrich IX zu Stolberg, Count (1436–1511)
Botho zu Stolberg, Count (1467–1538)
, Count (1501–1552)
Ludwig zu Stolberg, Count (1505–1574)
Johann zu Stolberg, Count (1549–1612)
Heinrich XI. zu Stolberg-Stolberg, Count (1551–1615)
Wolfgang Georg zu Stolberg-Stolberg, Count (1582–1631)
, Count (1594–1669)

Landgraviate of Thuringia (complete list) –
Frederick VI, Landgrave (1486–1525)
John, Landgrave (1525–1532)
John Frederick I, Landgrave (1532–1547)
John Ernest, Landgrave (1542–1553)
John Frederick II, Landgrave (1554–1566)
John William, Landgrave (1554–1572)

Swabian

Prince-Bishopric of Augsburg (complete list) –
Friedrich von Hohenzollern, Prince-bishop (1486–1505)
Heinrich von Lichtenau, Prince-bishop (1505–1517)
Christoph von Stadion, Prince-bishop (1517–1543)
Otto Truchsess von Waldburg, Prince-bishop (1543–1573)
Johann Eglof von Knöringen, Prince-bishop (1573–1575)
Marquard von Berg, Prince-bishop (1575–1591)
Johann Otto von Gemmingen, Prince-bishop (1591–1598)
Heinrich von Knöringen, Prince-bishop (1599–1646)

 (complete list) –
Philip I, Margrave (1487–1503)
then inherited by Christoph I to unite Baden

Margraviate of Baden/ Margraviate of Baden-Baden (complete list) –
Christopher I, Margrave of Baden-Baden (1475–1503), of Baden (1503–1515)
Philip I, Margrave of Baden (1515–1533)
Bernard III, co-Margrave of Baden (1515–1533), Margrave of Baden-Baden (1533–1536)
Ernest I, co-Margrave of Baden (1515–1533), Margrave of Baden-Durlach (1533–1553)
Franziska of Luxembourg-Ligny, Regent? (1536–1554)
Philibert I, Margrave (1554–1569)
Albert V, Duke of Bavaria, Regent (1569–c.1577)
Philip III, Margrave (1569–1588)
Edward Fortunatus, Margrave of Baden-Rodemachern (1575–1588), Margrave of Baden-Baden (1588–1596)
Ernest Frederick, Margrave of Baden-Durlach (1577–1604), of Baden-Baden (1594–1604), Regent of Baden-Hachberg (1590–1591)

Margraviate of Baden-Durlach (or Baden-Pforzheim) (complete list) –
Ernest I, co-Margrave of Baden (1515–1533), Margrave of Baden-Durlach (1533–1553)
Bernard IV, Margrave (1552–1553)
Charles II, Margrave (1553–1577)
Louis VI, Elector Palatine, Regent (1577–1583)
Anna of Veldenz, Regent (1577–1584)
Louis III, Duke of Württemberg, Regents (1577–1584)
Ernest Frederick, Margrave of Baden-Durlach (1577–1604), of Baden-Baden (1594–1604), Regent of Baden-Hachberg (1590–1591)

Margraviate of Baden-Hachberg (complete list) –
James III, Margrave (1577–1590)
Ernest Frederick, Margrave of Baden-Durlach (1577–1604), of Baden-Baden (1594–1604), Regent of Baden-Hachberg (1590–1591)
Ernest James, Margrave (1590–1591)

 (complete list) –
Christopher II, Margrave (1556–1575)
Edward Fortunatus, Margrave of Baden-Rodemachern (1575–1588), Margrave of Baden-Baden (1588–1596)
Philip IV, Margrave (1588–1620)

Prince-Bishopric of Constance (complete list) –
Hugo von Hohenlandenberg, Prince-bishop (1496–1529; 1531/2)
, Prince-bishop (1530–1531)
, Prince-bishop (1532–1537)
, Prince-bishop (1537–1548)
, Prince-bishop (1549–1561)
Mark Sittich von Hohenems Altemps, Prince-bishop (1561–1589)
Margrave Andrew of Burgau, Prince-bishop (1589–1600)

Prince-Provostry of Ellwangen (complete list) –
Albrecht V of Rechberg, Prince-provost (1461–1502)
Bernhard of Westerstetten, Prince-provost (1502–1503)
Albrecht VI Thumb of Neuburg, Prince-provost (1503–1521)
Henry of the Palatinate, Prince-provost (1551–1552)
Otto Truchsess von Waldburg, Prince-provost (1553–1573)
, Prince-provost (1573–1584)
, Prince-provost (1584–1603)

Fürstenberg-Baar (complete list) –
Wolfgang, Count (1499–1509)
Frederick III, Count (1509–1559)

Gutenzell Abbey (de:complete list) –
Walburga Gräter, Princess-abbess (c.1478–1503)
Walburga Bugglin, Princess-abbess (fl.1504)
Katharina Becht, Princess-abbess (fl.1516 1526)
Barbara von Stotzingen, Princess-abbess (fl.1526–1527)
Magdalena von Freyberg, Princess-abbess (fl.1532–1540)
Maria von Landenberg, Princess-abbess (1542–1567)
Maria Segesser von Brunegg, Princess-abbess (1567–1610)

Hohenzollern-Hechingen (complete list) –
Eitel Friedrich IV, Count (1576–1605)

Hohenzollern-Sigmaringen (complete list) –
Charles II, Count (1576–1606)

Princely Abbey of Kempten (complete list) –
 1481–1507)
Johann Rudolf of Raitenau, Prince-abbot (1507–1523)
 1523–1536)
 1536–1557)
-Burchberg 1557–1571)
Eberhard V of Stein, Prince-abbot (1571–1584)
Adalbert IV of Hoheneck, Prince-abbot (1584–1587)
 1587–1594)
Johann Adam Renner of Allmendingen, Prince-abbot (1594–1607)

Königsegg (complete list) –
John IV, Baron (1500–1544)
John Marquard, Baron (1544–1553)
John James, Baron (1544–1567)
Marquard IV, Baron (1567–1626)

Lindau Abbey (de:complete list) –
, Princess-abbess (1491–1531)
Katharina II von Bodmann, Princess-abbess (1531–1578)
Barbara von der Breiten-Landenberg, Princess-abbess (1578–1614)

Mindelheim (complete list) –
Georg II, Lord (1478–1528)
Casper, Lord (1528–1536)
George III, Lord (1536–1559), Baron (1559–1586)

Oettingen-Wallerstein (complete list) –
Friedrich VIII, Count (1557–1579)
Wilhelm II, Count (1579–1602)

Weingarten Abbey (complete list) –
Hartmann von Knorringen-Burgau, Prince-abbot (1491–1520)
Gerwig Blarer von Görsperg, Prince-abbot (1520–1567)
Johann III Halblizel, Prince-abbot (1567–1575)
Johann Christoph Rastner von Zellersberg, Prince-abbot (1575–1586)
Georg Wegelin, Prince-abbot (1586–1627)

Barony of Westerburg (complete list) –
Reinhard IV, Baron (1453–1522)

Duchy of Württemberg (complete list) –
Ulrich, Duke of Württemberg, Duke (1498–1519, 1534–1550)
Christoph, Duke of Württemberg, Duke (1550–1568)
Louis III, Duke of Württemberg, Duke (1569–1593)
Frederick I, Duke of Württemberg, Duke (1593–1608)

Swiss Confederacy

Italy

Republic of Genoa (complete list) –
Paolo da Novi, Doge (1507)
Giano II di Campofregoso, Doge (1512–1513)
Ottaviano Fregoso, Doge (1513–1515)
Antoniotto II Adorno, Doge (1522–1527)
Oberto Cattaneo Lazzari, Doge (1528–1531)
Battista Spinola, Doge (1531–1533)
Battista Lomellini, Doge (1533–1535)
Cristoforo Grimaldi Rosso, Doge (1535–1537)
Giovanni Battista Doria, Doge (1537–1539)
Giannandrea Giustiniani Longo, Doge (1539–1541)
Leonardo Cattaneo della Volta, Doge (1541–1543)
Andrea Centurione Pietrasanta, Doge (1543–1545)
Giovanni Battista De Fornari, Doge (1545–1547)
Benedetto Gentile Pevere, Doge (1547–1549)
Gaspare Grimaldi Bracelli, Doge (1549–1551)
Luca Spinola, Doge (1551–1553)
Giacomo Promontorio, Doge (1553–1555)
Agostino Pinelli Ardimenti, Doge (1555–1557)
Pietro Giovanni Chiavica Cibo, Doge (1557–1558)
Girolamo Vivaldi, Doge (1559–1561)
Paolo Battista Giudice Calvi, Doge (1561)
Giovanni Battista Cicala Zoagli, Doge (1561–1563)
Giovanni Battista Lercari, Doge (1563–1565)
Ottavio Gentile Oderico, Doge (1565–1567)
Simone Spinola, Doge (1567–1569)
Paolo Giustiniani Moneglia, Doge (1569–1571)
Giannotto Lomellini, Doge (1571–1573)
Giacomo Grimaldi Durazzo, Doge (1573–1575)
Prospero Centurione Fattinanti, Doge (1575–1577)
Giovanni Battista Gentile Pignolo, Doge (1577–1579)
Nicolò Doria, Doge (1579–1581)
Gerolamo De Franchi Toso, Doge (1581–1583)
Gerolamo Chiavari, Doge (1583–1585)
Ambrogio Di Negro, Doge (1585–1587)
Davide Vacca, Doge (1587–1589)
Battista Negrone, Doge (1589–1591)
Giovanni Agostino Giustiniani Campi, Doge (1591–1593)
Antonio Grimaldi Cebà, Doge (1593–1595)
Matteo Senarega, Doge (1595–1597)
Lazzaro Grimaldi Cebà, Doge (1597–1599)
Lorenzo Sauli, Doge (1599–1601)

Duchy of Mantua (complete list) –
Vincenzo I Gonzaga (1587–1612)

Duchy of Milan (complete list) –
Louis XII of France, Duke (1499–1512)
Maximilian Sforza, Duke (1512–1515)
Francis I of France, Duke (1515–1521)
Francesco II Sforza, Duke (1522–1535)
In 1535 the vacant duchy was annexed by the Holy Roman Emperor Charles V.
Philip II, Duke (1555–1598)
Philip II, Duke (1598–1621)
From 1556 to 1707 Milan was ruled in personal union with Spain.

Duchy of Modena (complete list) –
Cesare, Duke (1597–1628)

Principality of Orange (complete list) –
John IV, Prince (1475–1502)
Philibert, Prince (1502–1530)
René, Prince (1530–1544)
William I, Prince (1544–1584)
Philip William, Prince (1584–1618)

Papal States (complete list) –
Alexander VI, Pope (1492–1503)
Pius III, Pope (1503)
Julius II, Pope (1503–1513)
Leo X, Pope (1513–1521)
Adrian VI, Pope (1522–1523)
Clement VII, Pope (1523–1534)
Paul III, Pope (1534–1549)
Julius III, Pope (1550–1555)
Marcellus II, Pope (1555)
Paul IV, Pope (1555–1559)
Pius IV, Pope (1559–1565)
Pius V, Pope (1566–1572)
Gregory XIII, Pope (1572–1585)
Sixtus V, Pope (1585–1590)
Urban VII, Pope (1590)
Gregory XIV, Pope (1590–1591)
Innocent IX, Pope (1591)
Clement VIII, Pope (1592–1605)

Duchy of Parma (complete list) –
Ottavio Farnese (1549–1586)

Duchy of Savoy (complete list) –
Philibert II, Duke (1497–1504)
Charles III, Duke (1504–1553)
Emmanuel Philibert, Duke (1553–1580)
Charles Emmanuel I, Duke (1580–1630)

References 

16th century
 
-
16th century in the Holy Roman Empire